The Playwright is a 1911 silent film short starring Francis X. Bushman. It was produced at the Essanay Studios, Chicago and released by the General Film Company.

Cast
Francis X. Bushman

See also
Francis X. Bushman filmography

References

External links
 The Playwright at IMDb.com

1911 films
American silent short films
1911 short films
Essanay Studios films
American black-and-white films
Silent American drama films
1911 drama films
1910s American films